MPE may refer to:
 Malignant pleural effusion
 Markov perfect equilibrium, in game theory
 Master's of Psychiatric Epidemiology
 Max Planck Institute for Extraterrestrial Physics, a German research institute
 Maximum permissible exposure, the highest power of a light source that is considered safe
 Mean Percentage Error, in statistics
 Media Processing Engine, short MPE, is an image/video processor
 Methidiumpropyl-EDTA, a chemical that can intercalate and cleave DNA
 Methodology for process evaluation
 MIDI Polyphonic Expression, a MIDI specification to provide more expressive qualities for performing music
 Minimum polynomial extrapolation, a sequence transformation algorithm used for convergence acceleration of vector sequences
 Miss Philippines Earth
 Molecular Pathological Epidemiology, an interdisciplinary integration of molecular pathology and epidemiologylect
 Mors Principium Est, a Finnish melodic death metal band
 Multi-Processing Environment, a software element
 Multi-Programming Executive, a business-oriented minicomputer operating system made by Hewlett-Packard
 Multiprotocol Encapsulation, a Data link layer protocol
 Mumbai-Pune Expressway, an Indian motorway
 MyPhoneExplorer, a software application of Sony Ericsson and Android mobile phones
 Myxopapillary ependymoma, a tumor of the central nervous system
 Phaswane Mpe (1970-2004), South African author
 The Federal Aviation Administration Location identifier for Philadelphia Municipal Airport, an airport located in Philadelphia, Mississippi
 .MPE, alternative file extension for .MPG files by Minolta depending on color space